1,2,3,4,5-Pentakis(4-butylphenyl)-1,3-cyclopentadiene is an organochemical compound from the diene group and a cyclopentadiene derivative.  The anion of this compound is used as a sterically demanding ligand, often abbreviated as Cp[BIG], in the organometallic chemistry of sandwich compounds.

Preparation 
1,2,3,4,5-Pentakis(4-butylphenyl)-1,3-cyclopentadiene can be prepared in a one-step reaction by the palladium-catalyzed reaction of Zirconocene dichloride with 4-n-butylbenzene bromide.

Reactions 
1,2,3,4,5-Pentakis(4-butylphenyl)-1,3-cyclopentadiene reacts directly with a range of organometallic compounds or in reduced form as a sodium or potassium compound with the salts of main-group and transition metals.  The resulting metallocenes, in contrast to the unsubstituted Pentaphenylcyclopentadienyl complexes are in various solvents readily soluble. The perarylated metallocenes, such as Samarium, sometimes exhibit unusual stability.  This is likely to be explained by hydrogen bonds between the substituents. The reaction of 1,2,3,4,5-pentakis(4-butylphenyl)-1,3-cyclopentadiene with strong basic strontium and barium compounds provides the corresponding coplanar sandwich compounds.

References 

Cyclopentadienes
Aromatic hydrocarbons